Uridine diphosphate, abbreviated UDP, is a nucleotide diphosphate. It is an ester of pyrophosphoric acid with the nucleoside uridine. UDP consists of the pyrophosphate group, the pentose sugar ribose, and the nucleobase uracil.

UDP is an important factor in glycogenesis. Before glucose can be stored as glycogen in the liver and muscles, the enzyme UDP-glucose pyrophosphorylase forms a UDP-glucose unit by combining glucose 1-phosphate with uridine triphosphate, cleaving a pyrophosphate ion in the process. Then, the enzyme glycogen synthase combines UDP-glucose units to form a glycogen chain. The UDP molecule is cleaved from the glucose ring during this process and can be reused by UDP-glucose pyrophosphorylase.

See also
 DNA
 Nucleoside
 Nucleotide
 Oligonucleotide
 RNA
 UGGT

References

Nucleotides
Pyrimidinediones
Pyrophosphates
Phosphate esters